"Yon Yonson" is an infinitely recursive poem, nursery rhyme or song, perhaps best known from the novel Slaughterhouse-Five by Kurt Vonnegut, although Vonnegut did not create it.

Origins of the song 
The song is often sung in a Scandinavian accent (e.g. j pronounced as y, w pronounced as v). This accent is revealed by the name "Yon Yonson", which when recited in American English is usually rendered "Jan Jansen" or "John Johnson". The Swedish pronunciation "Yon Yonson" probably dates the origin of the song to soon after the Swedes' arrival in the United States.

A possible origin of the song is the dialect stage comedy Yon Yonson by Gus Heege and W. D. Coxey (1890).  The play's setting included a Minnesota lumber camp. However, no evidence shows that the song was actually performed as part of the play.

The song being set in Wisconsin is a satiric reference to Wisconsin's  Scandinavian-American culture and heritage.

Lyrics 

Numerous versions of the song exist, but all are similar to the following:
My name is Yon Yonson,
I live in Wisconsin.
I work in a lumber yard there.
The people I meet as 
I walk down the street,
They say "Hello!"
I say "Hello!"
They say "What's your name?"
I say: My name is Yon Yonson... (repeated again and again).

Other occurrences of the song 
 In the novel Slaughterhouse-Five by Kurt Vonnegut, "Yon Yonson" is used as a motif, ultimately serving as a model for the recursive, time-repeating structure of the book.
 The novel Dodsworth by Sinclair Lewis in Chapter 11
 Carl Sandburg included the song in his 1972 folk song collection, Flat Rock Ballads.
 The Canadian band The Dave Howard Singers released an industrial/punk version of "Yon Yonson" in 1987.
 The Children's Band Ralph's World released a version of this on their 2003 album Peggy's Pie Parlor. The lyrics were changed slightly from those shown in this article.
 The phrase was used in a TV promotion ("Altered States") for Calvin Klein perfume.
 In the video game Psychonauts, Sasha Nein will begin to recite this in an injury-induced daze if the battle with the mega-censor continues long enough. 
 The computer game "Baldur's Gate II" has a gnome character who joins the player's party named Jan Jansen. He often bursts into very mundane stories about himself that never seem to end.
 The song appears in the novel Coverup by Jay Bennett.

References

External links

  promotion for CK One and CK Be, based on the phrase.
 

American nursery rhymes
Songs about fictional male characters
Songs about occupations
Songs about Wisconsin
Kurt Vonnegut
Wisconsin in fiction
Nursery rhymes of uncertain origin